The Cadillac Automobile Company Building, at 3224 Locust St. in St. Louis, Missouri, was built in 1919.  It was listed on the National Register of Historic Places in 2005.

It was designed by Detroit, Michigan architect William A. Balsh.  It is a four-story tile and concrete-framed building with basement, with curtain wall construction.  It has a parapeted flat roof.  It has "the symmetry, colossal portico and entablature that characterize Neoclassical commercial buildings, but its use of Second Egyptian Revival stylistic details, especially the stylized column capitals, draws attention to both of its monolithic street elevations."

It was an auto distributorship building.

References

Auto dealerships on the National Register of Historic Places
National Register of Historic Places in St. Louis
Neoclassical architecture in Missouri
Buildings and structures completed in 1919